Curtis Green (born June 3, 1957) is a former American football defensive end. Green was drafted in the second round by the Detroit Lions out of Alabama State University in the 1981 NFL Draft. He played nine seasons for the Lions.

References

1957 births
Living people
Players of American football from Florida
American football defensive ends
Alabama State Hornets football players
Detroit Lions players
People from Quincy, Florida
Ed Block Courage Award recipients